Another Way to Go is the fifth full-length album by country music singer-songwriter Radney Foster.  It was released in 2002 on Dualtone Records; his second for the label.

As with his previous records, he featured in the production. He also engineered the disc, and wrote five songs by himself, as well as co-writing the other eight songs.  The disc peaked at number 39, and featured two singles; "Everyday Angel" (peaked at number 43) and "Scary Old World" (which reached number 52). Also included is "A Real Fine Place to Start," which became a number 1 hit in 2005 for Sara Evans from her album Real Fine Place.

Track listing 
 "A Real Fine Place to Start" (Radney Foster, George Ducas) – 3:45
 "Everyday Angel" (Foster) – 4:29
 "Again" (Foster, Darrell Brown) – 3:28
 "Sure Feels Right" (Foster) – 3:42
 "Disappointing You" (Foster) – 4:20
 "I Got What You Need" (Foster, James George Sonefeld) – 4:09
 "Tired of Pretending" (Foster, Stephany Delray) – 4:01
 "What Is It That You Do" (Foster, Brown) – 3:14
 "Scary Old World" (Foster, Harlan Howard) – 3:59
 duet with Chely Wright
 "Love Had Something to Say About It" (Foster) – 3:46
 "What Are We Doing Here Tonight" (Foster, Chip Boyd) – 3:36
 "Just Sit Still" (Foster) – 4:18
 "Another Way to Go" (Foster, Brown) – 4:17

Production 
 Produced By Radney Foster
 Engineers: Radney Foster, Chuck Linder, King Williams, Casey Wood
 Mixing: Casey Wood
 Mastering: Dave Collins

Personnel 
 Accordion: Tony Harrell
 Acoustic Guitar: Radney Foster
 Additional Vocals: Melinda Doolittle, Radney Foster, Christy Hathcock, Georgia Middleman, James Paulich, Kim Richey, Andy Thompson, Matt Thompson
 Bass, Upright Bass: Larry Paxton
 Cello: John Catchings
 Drums, Percussion: Matt Thompson
 Duet Vocals On "Scary Old World": Chely Wright
 Electric Guitar: Radney Foster, Mike McAdam, Joe Pisapia, Andy Thompson
 Fiddle: Barbara Lamb
 Hammer Dulcimer: Craig Duncan
 Lead Vocals: Radney Foster
 Mandolin: Chris Thile
 Percussion: Casey Wood
 Piano, Hammond Organ, Accordion, Wurlitzer: Tony Harrell
 Saxophone: Jim Hoke
 Slide: Mike McAdam
 Steel: Pete Finney
 Vocal Arrangement By Darrell Brown

Chart performance

References 

Dualtone Records albums
2002 albums
Radney Foster albums